The Thunderbolt is a 1919 American silent drama film directed by Colin Campbell and starring Katherine MacDonald, Spottiswoode Aitken and Thomas Meighan.

Cast
 Katherine MacDonald as Ruth Pomeroy 
 Spottiswoode Aitken as Allan Pomeroy 
 Thomas Meighan as Bruce Corbin 
 Forrest Stanley as Spencer Vail 
 Adda Gleason as Bruce Corbin's Mother 
 Pomeroy Cannon as Tom Pomeroy's Son 
 Mrs. L.C. Harris as Mammy Cleo 
 Jim Blackwell as The Butler 
 Robert Laidlaw as The Lawyer

unbilled
B. Reeves Eason Jr. - son of Ruth and Bruce
James Gordon - 
Antrim Short -

References

Bibliography
 Donald W. McCaffrey & Christopher P. Jacobs. Guide to the Silent Years of American Cinema. Greenwood Publishing, 1999.

External links
 

1919 films
1919 drama films
1910s English-language films
American silent feature films
Silent American drama films
American black-and-white films
Films directed by Colin Campbell
First National Pictures films
1910s American films